The IT Crowd is a Channel 4 British sitcom which is set in London. It was written and directed by Graham Linehan. It stars Richard Ayoade, Chris O'Dowd and Katherine Parkinson as the information technology staff of an office.

Series overview

Episodes

Series 1 (2006)

Series 2 (2007)

Series 3 (2008)

Series 4 (2010) 
Series 4 was recorded at Pinewood Studios in the spring of 2010.

Special (2013) 

In October 2011, Graham Linehan stated that a one-off special would air to end the series. On 8 May 2013, it was confirmed by Channel 4 and the BBC that the special would begin shooting in a few weeks, and would air later in the year. Den of Geek's spoiler-free review revealed the title as "The Internet Is Coming", though the title of this episode has been incorrectly given as "The Last Byte" by some sources.  The special had a running time of 48 minutes, which is twice the standard length of all the regular episodes.

Notes

References

External links 

 
 List of The IT Crowd episodes at the British Comedy Guide
 List of The IT Crowd episodes at Channel 4
 List of 

Channel 4-related lists
Lists of British sitcom episodes